Maharaja Krushna Chandra High School, Baripada, better known as M.K.C High School, is a high school in Baripada, Odisha. The high school was established in 1889. It is considered as one of the oldest government schools in Odisha.

Notable
 Uttam Mohanty, an actor in Odia language films
 Bijay Mohanty, an actor in Odia language films
 Jogesh Pati, an Indian-American theoretical physicist at the University of Maryland, USA

See also 
 Board of Secondary Education, Odisha

References

Teachers list

External links 
Department of School & Mass Education, Government of Odisha

Educational institutions established in 1889
High schools and secondary schools in Odisha
1889 establishments in India